Petina is a town and comune in the province of Salerno in the Campania region of south-western Italy.

Geography
The town is located on the Alburni mountain range, close to Basilicata region, and borders with the municipalities of Auletta, Corleto Monforte, Ottati, Sant'Angelo a Fasanella and Sicignano degli Alburni.

It is served by the A2 motorway (exit "Petina") and counts a railway station on the Sicignano-Lagonegro line, a railway line closed in 1987 due to modernization works.

References

External links

Cities and towns in Campania
Localities of Cilento